Lisia Góra may refer to the following places:
Lisia Góra, Lesser Poland Voivodeship (south Poland)
Lisia Góra, Lubusz Voivodeship (west Poland)
Lisia Góra, Kartuzy County in Pomeranian Voivodeship (north Poland)
Lisia Góra, Słupsk County in Pomeranian Voivodeship (north Poland)
Lisia Góra, West Pomeranian Voivodeship (north-west Poland)

See also